Newton Island is a rocky island  northwest of Laplace Island and  north-northwest of Cape Mousse, Adélie Coast, Antarctica. It was charted in 1951 by the French Antarctic Expedition and named after Sir Isaac Newton, English philosopher and mathematician.

See also 
 List of Antarctic and sub-Antarctic islands

References

Islands of Adélie Land